{{Taxobox
| name = Nothoaspis
| regnum = Animalia
| phylum = Arthropoda
| classis = Arachnida
| ordo = Ixodida
| familia = Argasidae
| subphylum = Chelicerata
| subclassis = Acari
| subfamilia = Ornithodorinae
| genus = Nothoaspis
}}Nothoapis is a genus in the soft-bodied tick family, Argasidae. It is very similar to those of the genus Antricola. The genus's origin is Nothoaspis reddelli'', which is the only tick species with a false shield on the anterior half of its body, propagating both a new genus and a new species.

References 

Ticks
Acari genera
Argasidae